Harry Eugene Atkinson (February 6, 1920 – June 30, 2001) was the mayor of Newport News, Virginia from July 1, 1974 to July 1, 1976. His single term in office saw the development of two major landmark buildings in the city's midtown area - the Rouse Tower office complex in 1974 and Newmarket North Mall in 1975. Also completed during Atkinson's term was the first span of the four-lane James River Bridge that would eventually replace the original two-lane bridge.

After serving as mayor, Atkinson led a group of Newport News citizens and the Newport News Historical Commission in creating Potter's Field, a city park on the former site of the Warwick County Poor Farm.

Notes

Mayors of Newport News, Virginia
1920 births
2001 deaths
20th-century American politicians